is a 2019 Japanese dark comedy film written, directed by, and starring Suzuki Matsuo, based on his 2018 novel 108. The film also stars Miho Nakayama, Shunsuke Daitō, Shori Doi, Louis Kurihara, and LiLiCo.

Synopsis
Screenwriter Gorō Kaiba discovers a Facebook post revealing that his wife, former actress Ayako, is having an extramarital affair. Furthermore, he notices that the post has 108 likes. Gorō can easily divorce Ayako, but he would end up paying her half of his assets, which total an estimated 10 million yen. Instead, he uses that money on a one-month womanizing streak, aiming to have sex with 108 women.

Cast
 Suzuki Matsuo as Gorō Kaiba
 Miho Nakayama as Ayako Kaiba
 Shunsuke Daitō as Seiya
 Shori Doi as Azusa
 Louis Kurihara as Michio
 LiLiCo as Adrianne
 Seizō Fukumoto
 Naoki Inui as Doctor Snake
 Miwako Shishido as Sumire Horikiri
 Mayu Hotta as Mizuki Arai
 Seminosuke Murasugi
 Shūji Okui
 Hideto Iwai as Itoi
 Wakana Sakai
 Maki Sakai as Mari Kaiba
 Natsuko Akiyama as Mitsuko Sunayama

Music
Gen Hoshino wrote and recorded the theme song .

Release
The film was released in Japan by on October 25, 2019.

References

External links
 
 108: Kaiba Gorō no Fukushū to Bōken at Eiga.com

2019 comedy-drama films
2010s Japanese-language films
Japanese comedy-drama films
Japanese films about revenge
Japanese sex comedy films
Adultery in films
Films directed by Suzuki Matsuo
Midlife crisis films
2010s Japanese films